Saint-Aignan-de-Cramesnil is a former commune in the Calvados department in the Normandy region in northwestern France. On 1 January 2019, it was merged into the new commune Le Castelet.

Population

Personalities
This village is known as the site of the death of the famous German tank commander Michael Wittmann on 8 August 1944, when his Tiger tank (number 007) was destroyed during an ambush. The crew of the destroyed tank was buried in an unmarked grave. In 1983, the German War Graves Commission located the burial site. Wittmann and his crew were reinterred together at the La Cambe German war cemetery, plot 47—row 3—grave 120, in France (about 70 km west).

See also
Communes of the Calvados department

References

Former communes of Calvados (department)
Calvados communes articles needing translation from French Wikipedia